The Union of Roma in Macedonia (Sojuz na Romite na Makedonija) is a political party in North Macedonia supporting the rights of the Romani people in the country. 
At the 2006 legislative elections, the party won 1 out of 120 seats as part of coalition led by the VMRO-DPMNE.
In 2017, after many years of participation in the coalitions led by VMRO-DPMNE, the party leader, Amdi Bajram stated that the party will no longer participate in the coalition.
The party will participate in a coalition with SDSM-Besa for the 2020 parliamentary elections.

Political parties of minorities in North Macedonia
Romani in North Macedonia
Romani political parties